Heckscher is a surname. Notable people with the surname include:  

 August Heckscher (1848–1941), German American philanthropist
 Charles Heckscher, American academic and management theorist
 Eli Heckscher (1879–1952), Swedish economist
 Ferdinand Heckscher (1806–1891), German actor
 Gunnar Heckscher (1909–1987), Swedish politician and son of Eli Heckscher
 Gustave Maurice Heckscher (1884–1967), American pioneer aviator
 Morrison Heckscher (born 1940), American art historian and curator
 Sten Heckscher, Swedish politician and grandson of Eli Heckscher
 William S. Heckscher (1904–1999), German art historian

Locations 
 The Heckscher Foundation for Children
 Heckscher State Parkway in western Town of Islip, Suffolk County, New York
 Heckscher State Park in East Islip, New York
 Heckscher Park (Huntington, New York), a local park on the National Register of Historic Places in Huntington, New York
 Heckscher Museum of Art within the aforementioned park in Huntington, New York

See also 
 Heckscher-Ohlin theory
 Heckscher-Ohlin model
 Hechsher